The Old Windsor Residents Association (OWRA) is an organisation which represents the residents of Old Windsor, Berkshire.

Royal Borough representation

The OWRA currently sponsors two councillors (Lynne Jones and Malcolm Beer) in the Royal Borough of Windsor and Maidenhead.

As of 2017, the OWRA are the official opposition on the Windsor and Maidenhead Borough Council, and Jones and Beer are the Leader and Deputy Leader of the Opposition, respectively.

References

External links
Official website of the Old Windsor Residents Association

Politics of the Royal Borough of Windsor and Maidenhead
Old Windsor
Locally based political parties in England